Juan Luis Carrera is a former musician turned musician manager.

As a musician, Carrera was the bassist for the Dischord Records band The Warmers and has also played with bands like Lungfish, Lois, Junk Man Ran, and The Junction.

His management company is Ravenhouse Management.

Sources

Ravenhouse Management Official Site

Dischord Records Official Site

Interview With Utopia Online Magazine

Bright Eyes frontman taking care of business

Living people
Year of birth missing (living people)
American rock bass guitarists
The Warmers members